Haihutun station is a station on Line 8 of the Beijing Subway. It was opened on December 30, 2018.

Layout 
The station has an underground island platform.

Exits 
There are four exits, lettered A2, B1, C, and D. Exits A2 and B1 are accessible.

References 

 Beijing Subway official map, showing official English name

Beijing Subway stations in Fengtai District